AA 6063 is an aluminium alloy, with magnesium and silicon as the alloying elements. The standard controlling its composition is maintained by The Aluminum Association. It has generally good mechanical properties and is heat treatable and weldable. It is similar to the British aluminium alloy HE9.

6063 is the most common alloy used for aluminium extrusion.  It allows complex shapes to be formed with very smooth surfaces fit for anodizing and so is popular for visible architectural applications such as window frames, door frames, roofs, and sign frames. Applications requiring higher strength typically use 6061 or 6082 instead.

Chemical composition 
The alloy composition of 6063 is:

Mechanical properties 
The mechanical properties of 6063 depend greatly on the temper, or heat treatment, of the material.

6063-O 
The material has elongation (stretch before ultimate failure) of 18%.

6063-T1 
It has elongation of 12%.

6063-T4

6063-T5 
It has elongation of 8%.

6063-T6 
T6 temper 6063 has an ultimate tensile strength of at least  and yield strength of at least .

Other tempers 
6063 is also produced in tempers T52, T53, T54, T55, and T832, with various improved  desired
properties.

Uses 
6063 is used for architectural fabrication, window and door frames, pipe and tubing, and aluminium furniture.

Welding 
6063 is highly weldable, using tungsten inert gas welding.  Typically, after welding, the properties near the weld are those of 6063-0, a loss of strength of up to 30%.  The material can be re-heat-treated to restore a higher temper for the whole piece.

References

Further reading
 "Properties of Wrought Aluminum and Aluminum Alloys: 6063", Properties and Selection: Nonferrous Alloys and Special-Purpose Materials, Vol 2, ASM Handbook, ASM International, 1990, p. 103-104.

Aluminum alloy table 

Aluminium alloys
Aluminium–magnesium–silicon alloys